Marissa Petra King (born 20 April 1991) is an English gymnast who represented Great Britain at the 2008 Summer Olympics in Beijing, China, as well as the 2007 and 2009 World Artistic Gymnastics Championships.  Marissa is the daughter of a British father and Thai mother and began gymnastics at age 8.  During her elite career she trained at the Huntingdon Olympic Gymnastics Club and competed for the University of Florida Gators NCAA gymnastics team.  In 2011, she became the NCAA National Champion on vault with a score of 9.875 as well as being an 11-time All American.

Elite career history

NCAA career history

References

External links
 

1991 births
Living people
Sportspeople from Cambridge
English people of Thai descent
British female artistic gymnasts
Gymnasts at the 2008 Summer Olympics
Olympic gymnasts of Great Britain
Florida Gators women's gymnasts